Testudinid alphaherpesvirus 3 (TeHV-3) is a species of virus in the genus Scutavirus, subfamily Alphaherpesvirinae, family Herpesviridae, and order Herpesvirales.

References 

Alphaherpesvirinae